Restvale Cemetery open 1927 is located at 11700 S. Laramie Ave. in Alsip, Illinois, United States, a suburb southwest of the city of Chicago. A number of Chicago blues musicians, educators, and notable people are buried here.

Restvale and Burr Oak were the last two historically black cemeteries to open in the area; both had their first burials in 1927.

Notable interments
 John Henry Barbee (1905–1964), blues singer, guitarist
 David Barksdale (1947–1974), leader of the Black Disciples street gang
 Doctor Clayton (1898–1947), blues songwriter and singer
 Nathaniel "Sweetwater" Clifton (1926–1990), professional basketball player
 Jazz Gillum (1904–1966), blues harmonica player
 Earl Hooker (1929–1970), blues guitarist
 Big Walter "Shakey" Horton (1918–1981), blues harmonica player
 J.B. Hutto (1926–1983), blues guitarist
 Little Johnny Jones (1924–1964), blues pianist and singer
 Samuel "Magic Sam" Maghett (1936–1969), blues musician
 Charles "Papa Charlie" McCoy (1909–1950), blues musician
 Kansas Joe McCoy (1905–1950), blues musician
 Romeo Nelson (1902–1974), boogie-woogie pianist
 James Burke "St. Louis Jimmy" Oden (1903–1977), blues musician, composer
 Pinetop Smith (1904–1929), boogie-woogie pianist
 Willie "Big Eyes" Smith (1936–2011), Grammy Award-winning musician and vocalist
 Eddie Taylor (1923–1985), blues guitarist, songwriter
 Theodore Roosevelt "Hound Dog" Taylor (1915–1975), blues musician
 George Washington Thomas (1883–1937), songwriter
 Luther Tucker (1936–1993), blues guitarist
 Muddy Waters (1913–1983), blues musician
 Johnny “Daddy Stove Pipe” Watson (1867–1963), blues musician
 Valerie Wellington (1959–1993), actress, opera singer, blues singer
 Tom Williams (1894–1937) Negro leagues pitcher, Chicago American Giants

See also
 List of United States cemeteries

References

External links
 
 

Cemeteries in Illinois
Cemeteries in Cook County, Illinois